Daosheng (ca. 360–434), or Zhu Daosheng, was an eminent Six Dynasties era Chinese Buddhist scholar. He is known for advocating the concepts of sudden enlightenment and the universality  of the Buddha nature.

Life
Born in Pengcheng, Daosheng left home to become a monk at eleven.  He studied in Jiankang under Zhu Fatai, and later at Lushan (Mount Lu) monastery with Huiyuan, and from 405 or 406 under Kumarajiva in Chang'an, where he stayed for some two years perfecting his education. He became one of the foremost scholars of his time, counted among the "fifteen great disciples" of Kumarajiva.

Sengzhao reports that Daosheng assisted Kumarajiva in his translation of the Lotus Sutra, Daosheng wrote commentaries on the Lotus Sutra, the Vimalakirti-nirdesa Sutra and the Astasahasrika-prajnaparamita Sutra (the last of which has been lost).  In 408, he returned to Lushan, and in  409 back to  Jiankang, where he remained for some twenty years, staying at the Qingyuan Monastery (青园寺) from 419.

Teachings
Daosheng controversially ascribed Buddha-nature to the icchantikas, based on his reading on a short version of the Mahaparinirvana Sutra, which in that short form appears to deny the Buddha-nature to icchantikas; the long version of the Nirvana Sutra, however (not yet known to Daosheng), explicitly includes the icchantikas in the universality of the Buddha-nature. Daosheng's bold doctrine of including icchantikas within the purview of the Buddha-nature, even before that explicit teaching had actually been found in the long Nirvana Sutra, led to the expulsion of Daosheng from the Buddhist community in 428 or 429, and he retreated to Lushan in 430.

With the availability of the long Nirvana Sutra after 430, through the translation of  Dharmakshema, Daosheng was vindicated and praised for his insight. He remained in Lushan, composing his commentary on the Lotus Sutra in 432, until his death in 434.

Daosheng's exegesis of the Nirvana Sutra had an enormous influence on interpretations of the Buddha-nature in Chinese Buddhism that prepared the ground for the Chán school emerging in the 6th century.

References

Sources

Bibliography
 
 Liebenthal, Walter (1955). A Biography of Chu Tao-Sheng, Monumenta Nipponica 11 (3), 284-316
 Shi Huijiao, Yang Tianshu, transl. (2022). The Biographies of eminent monks, Centre of Buddhist Studies, The University of Hong Kong. pp. 284-289

434 deaths
Jin dynasty (266–420) Buddhists
Liu Song Buddhists
Year of birth uncertain